The Shan people, also known as the Tai Long or Tai Yai, are a Tai ethnic group of Southeast Asia. The Shan are the biggest minority of Burma (Myanmar) and primarily live in the Shan State of this country, but also inhabit parts of Mandalay Region, Kachin State, Kayah State, Sagaing Region and Kayin State, and in adjacent regions of China (Dai people), Laos, Assam and Megalaya (Ahom people), Cambodia (Kula people), Vietnam and Thailand. Though no reliable census has been taken in Burma since 1935, the Shan are estimated to number 4–6 million, with CIA Factbook giving an estimate of five million spread throughout Myanmar which is about 10% of the overall Burmese population.

'Shan' is a generic term for all Tai-speaking peoples within Myanmar (Burma). The capital of Shan State is Taunggyi, the fifth-largest city in Myanmar with about 390,000 people. Other major cities include Thibaw (Hsipaw), Lashio, Kengtung and Tachileik.

Etymology 
The Shan use the endonym Tai (တႆး) in reference to themselves, which is also used in Chinese. Shan (ရှမ်း) is an exonym from the Burmese language; the term itself was historically spelt သျှမ်း (MLCTS: hsyam:), and is derived from the term Siam, the former name of Thailand. The term has been borrowed into Chinese. In Thai, the Shan are called Tai Yai (ไทใหญ่) or Ngiao in Tai yuan language. The Shan also have a number of exonyms in other minority languages, including Pa'O: ဖြဝ်ꩻ, Western Pwo Karen: ၥဲၫ့, and Mon သေံဇၞော် (sem).

Subdivisions

Major subdivisions
The major groups of Shan people are:
 Tai Yai or Thai Yai; the 'Shan Proper', by far the largest group, by which all Shan people are known in the Thai language.
 Tai Lü or Tai Lue. Its traditional area is in Xishuangbanna (China) and the eastern states.
 Tai Khuen or Tai Khün, a subgroup of the Tai Yai making up the majority in the Keng Tung area. The former ruling family of Kengtung State belonged to this group.
 Tai Nüa or Tai Neua,. The 'upper' or 'northern Tai'. This group lives north of the Shweli River, mostly in the area of Dehong, China.

The speakers of Shan, Lue, Khun and Nua languages form the majority of Dai nationality in PRC.

Other Tai Shan groups
There are various ethnic groups designated as Tai throughout Shan State, Sagaing Division and Kachin State. Some of these groups in fact speak Tibeto-Burman and Mon-Khmer and Assamese language, although they are assimilated into Shan society.

Ahom people: The Ahom people live in India's northeastern state of Assam and Arunachal Pradesh where tradition says that they established the Ahom kingdom, or Mueng Doon Soon Kham, and ruled for almost 600 years (1228-1826). They now speak the Assamese language with the Ahom language falling into disuse by the 19th century.
Tai Mao, living in the area along the banks of the Shweli River (Nam Mao). Chinese Shan language is also known as (Tai) Mao, referring to the old Shan State of Mong Mao.
Tai Khamti. The Tai Khamti an outlier group speaking the Khamti language. Traditionally they lived in the northernmost and westernmost edges of Shan-settled areas, such as Putao-O, Kachin State. Part of the Tai Khamti were once ruled by the Mongkawng Shan.
Tai Laing, Tai Leng, or Shan-ni, a Tai group living north of Myitkyina in the Kachin / Shan State border area.
Tai Ting, a group living around the confluence of the Ting and Salween rivers, just to the west of Gengma County, Yunnan, China.
Tai Taɯ: Taɯ means 'under' or 'south.' This group lives in southern Shan State.
Tai Nui, a group living to the south and east of Kengtung town.
Tai Phake. Related to the Tai Khamti, this group has a significant presence in Assam, India.
Tai Saʔ. The Tai Saʔ speak a variety of Ngochang (Achang), but are part of mainstream Shan society.
Tai Loi. The Tai Loi speak a Palaungic language resembling De'ang (especially the Bulei dialect of Yunnan) and Silver Palaung. They take part in mainstream Shan society.
Tai Dam: Also known as the "Black Tai."
Tai Dón: Also known as the "White Tai".
Maingtha, a Shan group that speaks a Northern Burmish language

Culture
The majority of Shan are Theravada Buddhists, and Tai folk religion. The Shan constitute one of the four main Buddhist ethnic groups in Burma; the others are the Bamar, the Mon and the Rakhine. The Mon were the main source of early Shan Buddhism and Shan scripts.

Most Shan speak the Shan language and are bilingual in Burmese. The Shan language, spoken by about 5 or 6 million, is closely related to Thai and Lao, and is part of the family of Tai languages. It is spoken in Shan State, some parts of Kachin State, some parts of Sagaing Division in Burma, parts of Yunnan, and in parts of northwestern Thailand, including Mae Hong Son Province and Chiang Mai Province. The two major dialects differ in number of tones: Hsenwi Shan has six tones, while Mongnai Shan has five. The Shan alphabet is an adaptation of the Mon–Burmese script via the Burmese alphabet. However, few Shan are literate in their own language.

The Shan are traditionally wet-rice cultivators, shopkeepers, and artisans.

History

The Tai-Shan people are believed to have migrated from Yunnan in China. The Shan are descendants of the oldest branch of the Tai-Shan, known as Tai Luang ('Great Tai') or Tai Yai ('Big Tai'). The Tai-Shan who migrated to the south and now inhabit modern-day Laos and Thailand are known as Tai Noi (or Tai Nyai), while those in parts of northern Thailand and Laos are commonly known as Tai Noi ('Little Tai' - Lao spoken) The Shan have inhabited the Shan Plateau and other parts of modern-day Burma as far back as the 10th century CE. The Shan kingdom of Mong Mao (Muang Mao) existed as early as the 10th century CE but became a Burmese vassal state during the reign of King Anawrahta of Pagan (1044–1077).

After the Pagan Kingdom fell to the Mongols in 1287, the Shan chiefs quickly gained power throughout central Burma, and founded:

Many Ava and Pegu kings of Burmese history between the 13th-16th centuries were of (partial) Shan descent. The kings of Ava fought kings of Pegu for control of the Irrawaddy valley. Various Shan states fought Ava for the control of Upper Burma. The states of Monyhin (Mong Yang) and Mogaung were the strongest of the Shan States. Monhyin-led Confederation of Shan States defeated Ava in 1527, and ruled all of Upper Burma until 1555.

The Burmese king Bayinnaung conquered all of the Shan states in 1557. Although the Shan states would become a tributary to Irrawaddy valley based Burmese kingdoms from then on, the Shan Saophas retained a large degree of autonomy. Throughout the Burmese feudal era, Shan states supplied much manpower in the service of Burmese kings. Without Shan manpower, it would have been harder for the Burmans alone to achieve their victories in Lower Burma, Siam, and elsewhere. Shans were a major part of Burmese forces in the First Anglo-Burmese War of 1824–1826, and fought valiantly—a fact even the British commanders acknowledged.

In the latter half of the 19th century Shan people migrated into Northern Thailand reaching Phrae Province. The Shan population in Thailand is concentrated mainly in Chiang Rai, Chiang Mai, Mae Hong Son, Mae Sariang, Mae Sai and Lampang, where there are groups which settled long ago and built their own communities and temples. Shan people are known as "Tai Yai" in north Thailand, where the word Shan is very seldom used to refer to them.

After the Third Anglo-Burmese War in 1885, the British gained control of the Shan states. Under the British colonial administration, the Shan principalities were administered separately as British protectorates with limited monarchical powers invested in the Shan Saophas.

After World War II, the Shan and other ethnic minority leaders negotiated with the majority Bamar leadership at the Panglong Conference, and agreed to gain independence from Britain as part of Union of Burma. The Shan states were given the option to secede after 10 years of independence. The Shan states became Shan State in 1948 as part of the newly independent Burma.

General Ne Win's coup d'état overthrew the democratically elected government in 1962, and abolished Shan saopha system.

Shan nationalism

The Shan have been engaged in an independence struggle that has led to intermittent civil war within Burma for decades. Currently two main Shan armed insurgent forces operate within Shan State: the Shan State Army/Special Region 3 and Shan State Army/Restoration Council of Shan State. In 2005 the Shan State National Army (SSNA) was effectively abolished after its surrender to the Burmese government. Some SSNA units joined the SSA/RCSS, which has yet to sign any agreements, and is still engaged in guerrilla warfare against the Burmese Army.

During conflicts, Shan civilians are often burned out of their villages and forced to flee into Thailand. Some of the worst fighting in recent times occurred in 2002 when the Burmese army shelled the Thai border town of Mae Sai, south of Tachileik, in an attempt to capture members of the SSA's Southern Faction who had fled across the Nam Ruak. While in July of that same year, in the Shan Township of Mong Yawng, the killing of a member of an NGO by the Burmese Tatmadaw, and the subsequent closure of the border to Thailand, caused an evacuation of the surviving members across the Mekong River to Laos. This evacuation was aided by members of the Shan State Army, and in turn brought tighter measures restricting foreign aid in the area as violence increased.

Whether or not there is an ongoing conflict, the Shan are subject to depredations by the Burmese regime; in particular, young men may be conscripted into the Burmese Army indefinitely, or enslaved to do road work for a number of months—with no wages and little food. The horrific conditions inside Burma have led to a massive exodus of young Shan males to neighbouring Thailand, where they are not given refugee status. Shan people in Thailand often work as undocumented labourers. Males typically find low-paid work in construction, while many Shan females fall in the hands of human trafficking gangs and end up in the prostitution business or bride trafficking. Despite the hardships, Shan people in Thailand are conscious of their culture and seek occasions to gather in cultural events.

Although the Government of Burma does not recognise Wa State, the Burmese military has frequently used the United Wa State Army (UWSA) as an ally for the purpose of fighting against Shan nationalist militia groups.

Communities in exile

Following the arrest of Sao Shwe Thaik of Yawnghwe in the Burmese coup d'état in March 1962 by the Revolutionary Council headed by General Ne Win, his wife Sao Nang Hearn Kham fled with her family to Thailand in April 1962 and Sao Shwe Thaik died in prison in November the same year. In exile, his wife took up the cause of the independence struggle of the Shan State. In 1964 Sao Nang Hearn Kham with her son Chao-Tzang Yawnghwe helped to form the Shan State War Council (SSWC) and the Shan State Army (SSA), becoming chair of the SSWC, and taking the Shan rebellion that started in 1958 to a new phase.
Sao Nang Hearn Kham died on 17 January 2003 in exile in Canada at the age of 86.

Prince Hso Khan Pha (sometimes written as Surkhanfa in Thai), son of Sao Nang Hearn Kham of Yawnghwe lived in exile in Canada. He was campaigning for the Burmese regime to leave the Federated Shan States and return to their own country, to respect the traditional culture and indigenous lands of the Shan people. He worked with the interim Shan Government, with Shan exiles abroad, and the Burmese regime to regain his country.

Opinion has been voiced in the Shan State, in neighboring Thailand, and to some extent in distant exile communities, in favor of the goal of "total independence for the Shan State." This came to a head when, in May 2005, Shan elders in exile declared the independence of the Federated Shan States.

The declaration of independence was rejected by most other ethnic minority groups, many Shan living inside Burma, and the country's leading opposition party, Aung San Suu Kyi's National League for Democracy. Despite the domestic opposition to the declaration, the Burmese Army is rumoured to have used it as a reason to crack down on Shan civilians. Shan people have reported an increase in restrictions on their movements and an escalation in Burmese Army raids on Shan villages. The October 2015 Burmese military offensive in Central Shan State has displaced thousands of Shan people, as well as Palaung, Lisu and Lahu people, causing a new humanitarian crisis. Shan civil society organisations are concerned about the lack of international response on the recent conflict.

See also
 Poy Sang Long
 Tai peoples
Shan Horse
Shan Hills
 Saharat Thai Doem

References

External links

Shan State Government Office
Shan People

Tai peoples
Ethnic groups in Myanmar
Ethnic groups in Vietnam
Ethnic groups in China
Ethnic groups in Thailand
Members of the Unrepresented Nations and Peoples Organization
Buddhist communities of Myanmar